A voorcompagnie (pre-company) is the naming given to the trading companies from the Republic of the Seven United Netherlands that traded in Asia between 1594 and 1602, before they all merged to form the Dutch East India Company (VOC). The pre-companies were financed by merchants from the Northern Netherlands and rich immigrants from the Southern Netherlands. Because of the deadly competition, the government forced the smaller trading companies to unite and form the (United) East India Company, that on its turn received the exclusive rights for the trade with Asia for the following 21 years.

History 
In the seven years before the founding of the VOC, 12 pre-companies were formed:

According to Jaap ter Haar, "they were sailing the coins out of each other's pockets and the shoes off each other's feet". In total fifteen expeditions were sent between 1594 and 1601, excluding 3 troubled expeditions via North Cape (Norway).

Citations

References

Sources:
Unger, W.S. (1948) De oudste reizen van de Zeeuwen naar Oost-Indië. De Linschoten-Vereeniging LI. Den Haag: Martinus Nijhoff.
Jonge, Jhr. Mr. J.K.J. de (1862) De opkomst van het Nederlandsch gezag in Oost-Indië, (1595-1610) Eerste deel Den Haag: Martinus Nijhoff
Wijnroks, E.H. (2003) Handel tussen Rusland en de Nederlanden, 1560-1640 Hilversum
  (2009) Geschiedenis van de VOC, p. 17-22.
  (2002) Een onderneming van landsbelang. De oprichting van de Verenigde Oostindische Compagnie in 1602

External links
 De VOC site: Voorcompagnieën geraadpleegd 5 September 2014
 De VOC site: Tabel Van Voorcompagnie naar VOC geraadpleegd 5 September 2014
 COLONIALVOYAGE.COM 'De expedities van de voorcompagniën' geraadpleegd 5 September 2014
 Maritieme kalender 1598 geraadpleegd 5 September 2014
 Maritieme kalender 1599 geraadpleegd 5 September 2014
 Maritieme kalender 1600 geraadpleegd 5 September 2014
 Maritieme kalender 1601 geraadpleegd 5 September 2014
  (2009) Geschiedenis van de VOC, p. 17-22.
  (2002) Een onderneming van landsbelang. De oprichting van de Verenigde Oostindische Compagnie in 1602

Trading companies
History of the Dutch East India Company
Pepper trade
Companies of the Dutch Republic